Van Hornesville is a hamlet in the town of Stark, north of Springfield Center, on NY 80 in Herkimer County, New York, United States. Van Hornesville has a post office with the ZIP Code 13475.

References

Hamlets in Herkimer County, New York
Hamlets in New York (state)